α-PHiP (also known as α-PiHP), is a stimulant drug of the cathinone class that has been sold online as a designer drug. It is a positional isomer of pyrovalerone, with the methyl group shifted from the 4-position of the aromatic ring to the 4-position of the acyl chain. In a classic 2006 study of pyrrolidinyl cathinone derivatives by Meltzer et al. at Organix, the alpha-isobutyl derivative of pyrovalerone, O-2494, was found to have the highest potency in vitro as an inhibitor of the dopamine transporter of the alpha substituted derivatives tested, however it was not until ten years later in July 2016 that α-PHiP was first identified as a designer drug, when it was reported to the EMCDDA by a forensic laboratory in Slovenia.

See also 
 3F-PiHP
 Aletamine
 α-PHP
 α-PCYP
 Solriamfetol

References 

Pyrrolidinophenones
Designer drugs
Serotonin-norepinephrine-dopamine releasing agents